Sabrang Utsav is a single-day Indian classical music festival held in memory of the singer Bade Ghulam Ali Khan, and was started by his disciple Malti Gilani. The festival has been held every year since 1968 (the year of Khan's death in Hyderabad, India). It takes place in the winter months in Delhi and typically has two recitals.

See also

References

External links

Hindustani classical music festivals
Festivals in Delhi
Music festivals established in 1968
1968 establishments in Delhi